Barnegat can refer to:

Places

Canada
 Barnegat, Alberta, a locality in Canada

United States
 Barnegat (CDP), New Jersey, a census-designated place within Barnegat Township, New Jersey
 Barnegat Bay in Ocean County, New Jersey, United States
 Barnegat Inlet in Ocean County, New Jersey
 Barnegat Lighthouse State Park, a park on Long Beach Island in Ocean County, New Jersey
 Barnegat Peninsula, a barrier peninsula in Ocean County, New Jersey
 Barnegat Township, New Jersey, a township in Ocean County, New Jersey,

Schools
 Barnegat High School, a public high school in Barnegat Township, New Jersey
 Barnegat Township School District, a public K-12 school district in Barnegat, Township, New Jersey

Ships
 , a United States Navy seaplane tender in commission from 1941 to 1946
 , commissioned into the United States Navy between 1941 and 1946
 , built in 1904

See also
 Barnegat Light (disambiguation)